In New Zealand, the chocolate fish or choccy fish is a popular confectionery item, and in Kiwi culture a common reward for a job done well ("Give that kid a chocolate fish").

They are made of pink or white marshmallow covered in a thin layer of milk chocolate with the ripples or "scales" on the fish created simply by the fish moving under a blower; this slides the unset chocolate back, creating the illusion of scales on the fish. Several manufacturers make the fish; the most well-recognised is Cadbury. Smaller, or "fun-sized" variants of the chocolate fish are colloquially referred to as "sprats".

History
Chocolate fish have been available in New Zealand since at least 1903, though early varieties may not have been made of marshmallow. Marshmallow fish were being produced in Dunedin in 1937. For a short period, in the late 1990s to early 2000s, there was a Tip Top brand chocolate fish ice-cream. In 2019, the chocolate fish was added to the Cadbury Favourites box.

In 1970 RM Barclay, Member of Parliament for New Plymouth, asked a question in Parliament about the price of chocolate fish.

References

New Zealand confectionery
Fish in human culture
Chocolate desserts